Cypriot Diaspora may refer to:

Greek Cypriot diaspora
Turkish Cypriot diaspora